Beryah Khani (also Romanized as Beryah Khānī and Beryeh Khānī; also known as Beryā Khānī, Būrīākhānī, and Būryā Khānī) is a village in Gurani Rural District, Gahvareh District, Dalahu County, Kermanshah Province, Iran. At the 2006 census, its population was 211, in 40 families.

References 

Populated places in Dalahu County